William Wagner (November 7, 1883March 11, 1964) was an American character actor. He appeared in over 50 films between 1931 and 1948. During these years, most of times , he had played in small roles such as butlers, anonymous clerks, persnickety store managers, and other such roles. He became famous for The Rustler's Roundup (1933), It Happened One Night (1934), and Rebecca of Sunnybrook Farm (1938)

Film
Born in New York City, New York, Williams is best remembered for his role in the Our Gang films For Pete's Sake! and The Lucky Corner.

Death
Wagner died on March 11, 1964, in Hollywood, California. He was 80 years of age.

Selected filmography
 Rustlers' Roundup (1933)
 Honky Donkey (1934)
 Jane Eyre (1934)
 The Gay Divorcee (1934)
 For Pete's Sake! (1935)
 The Lucky Corner (1936)
 Second Honeymoon (1937)

References

External links
 
 
 

1883 births
1964 deaths
American male film actors
20th-century American male actors